The Labo shrew rat (Rhynchomys labo) is a species of shrewlike rat in the subfamily Murinae. It was discovered at elevations above 1250 m on Mt. Labo of the Bicol Peninsula of Luzon in the Philippines and described in 2019.

References

Rhynchomys
Mammals described in 2019

Rhynchomys labo